Seleucia pectinella is a species of snout moth in the genus Seleucia. It was described by Pierre Chrétien in 1911, and is known from Algeria, Croatia, Albania, Sicily, Crete and mainland Greece.

The wingspan is about 25 mm.

References

Moths described in 1911
Anerastiini
Moths of Europe